Themidithapadu is a village in Prakasam district in the state of Andhra Pradesh, India. The village is listed under the Karamchedu Mandal, in Parchur or Paruchuru Parchur or Paruchuru Assembly constituency and in Bapatla parliament constituency.

References

Villages in Prakasam district